Alexander Rogers (February 12, 1842 – July 2, 1933) was a merchant and political figure in New Brunswick, Canada. He represented Albert County in the Legislative Assembly of New Brunswick from 1875 to 1878 and Albert in the House of Commons of Canada from 1878 to 1882 as a Liberal member.

He was born in Hopewell Hill, New Brunswick, the son of William Rogers and Eliza Loughead, and was educated at Mount Allison College. In 1866, Rogers married Bessie Moore. His election to the provincial assembly was appealed twice but Rogers won the by-elections which followed each time. He ran unsuccessfully for reelection to the House of Commons in 1882, 1883 and 1887. He died at Hopewell Hill at the age of 91.

Electoral record

References 

1842 births
1933 deaths
New Brunswick Liberal Association MLAs
Members of the House of Commons of Canada from New Brunswick
Liberal Party of Canada MPs